The Ohio Bobcats women's basketball team is an intercollegiate varsity sports program of Ohio University. The team is a member of the Mid-American Conference East Division competing in Division I of the National Collegiate Athletic Association (NCAA).  The Bobcats have played their home games in the Convocation Center since 1973.

History
 
Ohio University's women’s basketball program began its unofficial debut in 1965. It was created by the Women’s Sports and Recreation Department (WRA) chapter of Ohio University. The team, led by Bev Smith, competed for 8 years before they became a part of the Women’s Intercollegiate Athletics (WICA) organization. This marked the beginning of funding from athletics as opposed to education.

Upon its official debut, the women’s basketball team played their first game in the 1973–74 season. The Bobcats have won three Mid-American Conference tournament titles in 1986, 1995, and 2015. They have been MAC regular season champions four times, most recently in the 2015–16 season. They have clinched a spot in the NCAA women's tournament three times, in which they have gone 0–3, most recently appearing in the 2014–15 season.

The Bobcats' most notable season came in 1985–86. The team went 24–2 in the regular season, with a 16–2 record in the MAC. They won their first MAC season and tournament titles, as well as setting eight school records that are still held as of 2016. Their coach, 23-year-old Amy Prichard, became the first Ohio head coach to be awarded the honor of the MAC Coach of the Year.

The Bobcats' current head coach is Bob Boldon. Boldon played college basketball at Walsh University from 1993–97. After debuting during the 2013–14 season, Boldon's team posted a record of 9–20. During his second season at Ohio University, he led the Bobcats to their first winning season since the 2007–08 season. Boldon led the team to the MAC championship, clinching a spot in the 2015 NCAA tournament. The team lost in the first round to Arizona State, by a score of 74–55. In the 2018-19 season the Bobcats won 30 games, being the first basketball team to do so between both Bobcat men's and women's programs.

Seasonal Results

as of 3/4/2023

Postseason results

NCAA tournament results
The Bobcats have appeared in three NCAA Tournaments. Their combined record is 0-3.

Women's National Invitation Tournament results
Ohio has been selected to participate in five Women's National Invitation Tournaments. Their combined record is 6-6.

Coaching staff

Bobcat basketball traditions
Ohio is a tradition-rich school, and many of those traditions are associated with athletics events, especially basketball. Some Ohio traditions include:
Rufus the Bobcat – The school mascot, a fierce yet friendly looking Bobcat that always sports an Ohio jersey with a number "1" on the back.
Ohio Varsity Band – The pep band which performs at every basketball game.
"Stand Up and Cheer" – Ohio's fight song
"Alma Mater, Ohio" – Ohio's alma mater song

All-time records

All-time coaching records

Source: Ohio Basketball Media Guide

As of 3/4/2023

Top five winning coaches

All-time MAC records
The Bobcats have won 2 Mid-American Conference tournament titles in 1986, and 2015 as well as 4 MAC regular-season titles in 1986, 1995, 2015, and 2016. At the end of the 2021–2022 MAC season, Ohio owns an all-time MAC record of 342–348 (.496) in 41 seasons of league competition. The following are the all members of the MAC past and present not counting the postseason play as of 3/4/2023:

References

External links